The 1874–75 season was the second season of competitive football by Dumbarton.

Scottish Cup

Dumbarton reached the semi final of the Scottish Cup before losing to local rivals Renton, after a protested match and a 1-1 draw.

The second round of the Scottish Cup pitted Dumbarton against Rangers for their first ever meeting, and this remains the oldest competitive tie between Dumbarton and any of the current Scottish league clubs.

Friendlies
During the season, 6 'friendlies' matches were reported to have been played, including home and away fixtures against neighbours Vale of Leven.  In addition, a match was played against Dumbarton Cricket and Football Club - who would later change their name to Lennox F.C.. Of these matches, five were drawn and one lost, scoring two goals and conceding five.

Player statistics
Amongst those making their first appearances for the club this season was Archie Lang.  Of those playing their final game in Dumbarton 'colours', Robert Ball was of note being the player who scored Dumbarton's first ever goal.

Only includes appearances and goals in competitive Scottish Cup matches.

Source:

References

1874–75
Dumbarton